SPV GmbH (short for Schallplatten Produktion und Vertrieb GmbH, "Vinyl Production and Distribution Company") is a German independent record label. Founded on 1 January 1984, it has slowly grown to be one of the largest independent distributors and record labels worldwide.

It has several sub-labels that it produces and distributes, including the labels Synthetic Symphony (industrial), Steamhammer (heavy metal, hard rock), Long Branch Records (alternative, indie, progressive rock, progressive metal, metalcore), Oblivion (darkwave, gothic), SPV Recordings (pop, rock) and Cash Machine Records (hip hop).

In November 2020, SPV was acquired by Napalm Records.

Artists on Steamhammer

 Arena
 Angra
 Anne Clark 
 Blackmore's Night
 Doro 
 Evildead
 Eric Burdon
 Helloween 
 Iced Earth 
 Judas Priest
 Kamelot 
 Kreator
 MAGNUM
 Moonspell 
 Monster Magnet 
 Motörhead 
 Pro-Pain 
 Prong 
 Rhapsody of Fire
 Saxon 
 Sepultura 
 Skinny Puppy 
 Sodom
 Type O Negative 
 Whitesnake 
 Vicious Rumors

Artists on Long Branch Records

22 (NO)
 A Pale Horse Named Death (US)
 Agent Fresco (IS)
 Annisokay (DE)
 As Everything Unfolds (UK)
 Atlas (FI)
 Birth of Joy (NL)
 Black Crown Initiate (US)
 Black Map (US)
 Black Orchid Empire (UK)
 Borders (UK)
 Cabal (DK)
 Chimaira (US)
 Cold Night for Alligators (DK)
 Demons of Ruby Mae (UK)
 Drowning Pool (US)
 Everlast (US)
 Fit for an Autopsy (US)
 Frames (DE)
 From Sorrow to Serenity (UK)
 Ghost Iris (DK)
 Ivy Crown (DK)
 Jonestown (UK)
 Kaiser Chiefs (UK)
 Kid Dad (DE)
 KOJ (DE)
 Livingston (UK)
 Madina Lake (US)
 Paradisia (UK)
 Prospective (IT)
 Razz (DE)
 Rendezvous Point (NO)
 Second Relation (AT)
 Shields (UK)
 Siamese (DK)
 Silent Screams (UK)
 The Five Hundred (UK)
 The Hirsch Effekt (DE)
 The Interbeing (DK)
 The Intersphere (DE)
 The Low Frequency in Stereo (NO)
 The Royal (NL)
 Tides from Nebula (PL)
 Time, The Valuator (DE)
 Uneven Structure (FR)
 Unprocessed (DE)
 Valis Ablaze (UK)
 Walking Dead on Broadway (UK)
 Within the Ruins (US)
 White Miles (AT)

Insolvency
The managing partner, Manfred Schütz, decided to submit an application to commence insolvency proceedings on 25 May 2009 – roughly equivalent to Chapter 11 bankruptcy protection in the US and administration in the UK. In response to this, on 27 May 2009, the District Court of Hannover appointed the attorney Manuel Sack as the provisional insolvency administrator. According to Schütz, together with Sack, the management of SPV GmbH would not only carry on business operations, but also continue working in the areas of production and distribution in the usual way.
After a substantial resizing of its business and a partnership venture agreement with Sony Music, which obtained the rights for some of the German label's main artists and for part of the catalogue, SPV went back into production with a new staff at the end of 2009.

See also
List of record labels
 List of bands distributed by SPV

References

German independent record labels
Record labels established in 1984
Rock record labels
Heavy metal record labels
IFPI members
Napalm Records